Gerry Mullan may refer to:

Gerry Mullan (footballer), footballer from Northern Ireland
Gerry Mullan (politician), Northern Ireland politician